The 7th Military Region of Vietnam People's Army, is directly under the Ministry of Defence of Vietnam, tasked to organise, build, manage and command armed forces defending the South East Vietnam. 

 Command Headquarters: Ho Chi Minh City
 Commander: Major General Nguyễn Trường Thắng
 Political Commissar: Lieutenant General Trần Hoài Trung
 Deputy Commander cum Chief of Staff: Major General Đặng Văn Hùng

Agencies
 Department of Staff
 Department of Politics
 Division of Organisation
 Division of Cadre
 Division of Policy
 Division of Propogendar and Training
 Division of Thoughts and Culture
 Military Court of Military Zone
 Military Procuratorate of Military Zone
 Military Museum of Ho Chi Minh Campaign of 7th Military Zone:  No. 2, Road Lê Duẩn, District 1, Ho Chi Minh City
 Newspaper of 7th Military Zone
 Troupe of 7th Military Zone
 Department of Logistics
 Department of Technique
 Office of Command of 7th Military Zone

Units
 Military Command of Hồ Chí Minh municipality
 Military Command of Bà Rịa–Vũng Tàu province
 Military Command of Bình Dương province
 Military Command of Bình Phước province
 Military Command of Bình Thuận province
 Military Command of Đồng Nai province
 Military Command of Tây Ninh province
 Military Command of Lâm Đồng province
 Military Command of Long An province
 Military School of Military Zone
 5th Infantry Division
 302nd Infantry Division
 317th Infantry Division
 Other special troops: anti-aircraft, anti-aircraft artillery, tanks, combat engineer

Successive Commander and Leadership

Commanders

 Colonel General Trần Văn Trà (1976–1978)
 Lieutenant General (1974), Colonel General (1980), General (1984) Lê Đức Anh, (1978–1981)
 Lieutenant General Đồng Văn Cống (1981–1982)
 Lieutenant General, Colonel General (1986) Nguyễn Minh Châu (1982–1987)
 Lieutenant General Nguyễn Thới Bưng (1987–1990)
 Lieutenant General Bùi Thanh Vân (1990–1994)
 Lieutenant General Đỗ Quang Hưng (1994–1995)
 Lieutenant General Lê Văn Dũng (1995–1998): promoted to General, Director of General Department of Politics of Vietnam People's Army
 Lieutenant General Phan Trung Kiên (1998–2003): promoted to Colonel General,  member of Central Committee of the Communist Party of Vietnam, Deputy Minister of Ministry of Defence.
 Lieutenant General Nguyễn Văn Chia (2003–2005)
 Lieutenant General Lê Mạnh (2005-2/2009)
 Lieutenant General Triệu Xuân Hòa (2/2009-2011): honoured as Hero of the People's Armed Forces (1983)
 Lieutenant General Trần Đơn (2011-2015)
 Lieutenant General Võ Minh Lương (2015-2020)
 Major General Nguyễn Trường Thắng (2020-present)

Political Commissioners, Deputy Commanders of Politics 
 Colonel General Trần Văn Trà (1976–1978)
 Colonel General Lê Đức Anh (1978–1981)
 Colonel General Nguyễn Minh Châu (1982–1987)
 Lieutenant General Lê Thành Tâm (1997–2004): Deputy Commander of politics, now Chairman of Ho Chi Minh City Vietnam Veterans.
 Lieutenant General Nguyễn Thành Cung (2004–2010), Political Commissar. member of Central Committee of the Communist Party of Vietnam
 Lieutenant General Phạm Văn Dỹ (2010-2018)
 Lieutenant General Trần Hoài Trung (2018-present)

References

Military regions of the People's Army of Vietnam